Palmovka Theatre, also known as the Theatre S. K. Neumann, Divadlo pod Palmovkou and the Urban and Regional Theatre, is a classic drama theatre located in the Prague district of Libeň at the bottom of Zenklova street in Prague near the intersection and subway station Palmovka. In addition to the main stage it has the attic theatre, a small studio theatre for more intimate performances.

History
There has been a theatre on the site since 1865 but the current theatre company only dates to August 1949, when under the direction of the minister for Culture the current troupe took form. Until 1992 the Libeň theatre bore the name of the S. K. Neumann Theatre, but with the fall of communism the theatre took its current name.

References

Culture in Prague
Theatres in Prague
Music venues in Prague
1892 establishments in Austria-Hungary
Theatres completed in 1892
Music venues completed in 1892